American rapper Logic has released eight studio albums, one soundtrack album, eight mixtapes, 48 singles (including 28 singles as a featured artist), three promotional singles and 40 music videos. In December 2010, Logic released his debut mixtape, Young, Broke & Infamous. Logic released his second mixtape, Young Sinatra, in September 2011, which included the song, "All I Do". He later released the mixtapes, Young Sinatra: Undeniable, in April 2012 and Young Sinatra: Welcome to Forever, in May 2013.

Logic went on to release his debut studio album, Under Pressure, on October 21, 2014, to generally favorable reviews from music critics. The album debuted at number four on the US Billboard 200 chart. The album spawned two singles: The title track and "Buried Alive".

His second studio album, The Incredible True Story, was released in November 2015 and debuted at number three on the US Billboard 200 chart and at number one on the Top R&B/Hip-Hop Albums chart. The album included the singles: "Young Jesus", "Like Woah" and "Fade Away". He was later featured on the song, "Sucker for Pain" for the Suicide Squad soundtrack, peaking at number 15 on the Billboard Hot 100 chart. He later released the mixtape, Bobby Tarantino, in July 2016 and included the singles: "Flexicution" and "Wrist".

Logic's third studio album, Everybody, was released in May 2017 and debuted at number one in the US, becoming his first album to reach the top of the Billboard 200 with 247,000 album-equivalent units, of which 196,000 were pure album sales. The album spawned three singles: The title track, "Black Spiderman", and "1-800-273-8255", with the latter single peaking in the top ten in various countries and later became certified platinum 8x by the Recording Industry Association of America (RIAA). Following the release of the album, Logic released the mixtape, Bobby Tarantino II, in March 2018. It debuted at number one in the US, becoming his second consecutive number-one album in the US and included the singles: "44 More", "Overnight" and "Everyday".

His fourth studio album, YSIV, was released in September 2018 and debuted at number two on the US Billboard 200 chart. He released Supermarket, the soundtrack to his novel of the same name in March 2019.

His fifth studio album, Confessions of a Dangerous Mind, was released two months later in May and debuted at number one in the US, making it his third album to reach the top of the chart. The album included the singles "Keanu Reeves", the title track and "Homicide", with the latter single peaking in the top ten in various countries.

Logic's sixth studio album, No Pressure, was released on July 24, 2020, to generally favorable reviews from music critics. The album debuted at number two on the US Billboard 200 with 221,000 album-equivalent units, of which 172,000 were pure album sales.

Logic's seventh studio album, Vinyl Days, was released on June 17, 2022. This is Logic's last album with Def Jam, and is a farewell to all of his memories with them. Critics responded with generally positive reviews to the album. Vinyl Days featured a lot of "famous people" including Morgan Freeman, J. J. Abrams, Nardwuar, Tony Revolori, Anthony Fantano, and more.

Logic's eighth studio album, College Park, was released on February 24th, 2023. College Park is Logic's first studio album as an independent artist on his own label: BobbyBoy Records, Three Oh One Productions, BMG. College Park is where Logic began writing his first songs and started putting on small concerts with 100-200 people, as mentioned at the end of the song Ayo on College Park. The story/skits of the album takes the listeners back to when Logic was in College Park with recording music and beginning his journey as a rapper.

He has another album that has been talked about for years, titled Ultra 85. Ultra 85 is still unreleased, but has been spoken about by Logic for many years. There are multiple theories about this album that have been circling among Logic's fans. This album is mentioned at the end of Logic's sixth album, No Pressure. In the song Heard Em Say, Thalia (an AI Robot who has been guiding listener's through Logic's album since his first album, Under Pressure) says "This concludes the No Pressure program... No Pressure... Ultra 85... Welcome to the Ultra 85 program." This lead many fans to beleive that No Pressure is actually Ultra 85, however Logic has since discredited this theory and said that Ultra 85 is still in the works. During a livestream on Twitch, Logic also mentioned that No Pressure includes some songs/verses that were originally for Ultra 85.

Albums

Studio albums

Compilation albums

Soundtracks

Mixtapes

Beat tapes

Singles

As lead artist

As featured artist

Promotional singles

Other charted songs

Guest appearances

Music videos

Notes

References

Discographies of American artists
Hip hop discographies
discography